Anita Elson (1898–1985) was an American dancer and singer who appeared in revues in New York City and London, England, in the early 20th century.

She performed in The Cohan Revue-(1916), a production of George M. Cohan. The show debuted at the Astor Theatre in February 1916. Cohan managed the venue and wrote both book, lyrics, and tunes for the presentation. A long list of entertainers who participated included Valli Valli, Elizabeth Murray, Lila Rhodes, and Juliet Delf.

A success in the London production of Little Nellie Kelly earned her a spot in the cast of the 1924 Ziegfeld Follies. Elson was aboard the RMS Olympic of the White Star Line when it departed New York City for Cherbourg, France, and
Southampton, England, on August 2, 1924.

On February 26, 1926 she recorded a duet with Leo Franklyn and two songs with chorus and orchestra in London. These were from the Revue Turned Up at the New Oxford Theatre and were issued on HMV B2279-80.

in the early 1900s she was one of a number of starlets (50) featured on cards given away by the Hignett cigarette company of Great Britain in their CHESS cigarette packets.

References

External links
Anita Elson image from the National Portrait Gallery
Anita Elson New York Public Library Digital Gallery photo

American female dancers
Dancers from New York (state)
Vaudeville performers
1898 births
1985 deaths
20th-century American singers
20th-century American women singers
20th-century American dancers